Wellington Gonzaga de Assis Filho (born 5 June 2001), known as Wellington Tim, Wellington Carioca or simply Wellington, is a Brazilian footballer who plays for Spanish club Almería B. Mainly a central defender, he can also play as a left back.

Club career

Criciúma
Born in Rio de Janeiro, Wellington joined Criciúma's youth setup in 2019, from Hercílio Luz. After playing in the 2020 Copa São Paulo de Futebol Júnior, he was promoted to the main squad.

Wellington made his first team debut on 2 February 2020, starting in a 1–1 Campeonato Carioca home draw against Marcílio Dias.

Santos (loan)
In September 2020, Wellington joined Santos and was initially assigned to the B-team; the loan deal until December 2021 was confirmed by Criciúma on 28 October, after Santos' transfer ban was lifted. He made his first team – and Série A – debut the following 26 January, coming on as a half-time substitute for Wagner Leonardo in a 0–2 away loss against Atlético Mineiro.

Wellington made his Copa Libertadores debut on 30 January 2021, just in the tournament's Final, by replacing Felipe Jonatan late into a 0–1 loss against Palmeiras. He subsequently featured rarely for the first team, and spent the remainder of his loan spell with the under-20 and under-23 squads.

Almería
After returning from loan, Wellington featured rarely before signing a three-year contract with UD Almería on 26 August 2022, being assigned to the reserves in Tercera Federación.

Career statistics

References

External links
Santos FC profile 

2001 births
Living people
Footballers from Rio de Janeiro (city)
Brazilian footballers
Association football defenders
Campeonato Brasileiro Série A players
Campeonato Brasileiro Série B players
Criciúma Esporte Clube players
Santos FC players
Tercera Federación players
UD Almería B players
Brazilian expatriate footballers
Brazilian expatriate sportspeople in Spain
Expatriate footballers in Spain